Diana Mulili is a Kenyan economist, businesswoman, executive coach and corporate executive. She is the director, Digital Ecosystem for Africa at Prudential Africa. She is based in Nairobi, Kenya's capital city. Ske took up her current position in February 2022. Before that, she was the Chief Growth Officer (CGO), at Xetova Limited, an e-commerce company, focusing of B2B supply chain issues. Xetova is based in Nairobi, Kenya.

Background and education
She was born in Kenya . She holds a Bachelor of Arts degree in Economics from the University of Nairobi. Her Master's Degree in Business Administration was also awarded by Nairobi University. Diana also obtained an Executive MBA awarded by the ALU Business School, in Kigali, Rwanda. She also holds a Group Coaching Certificate awarded by The Academy of Executive Coaching. In addition, she has attended various leadership and management courses, including at the Stanford Graduate School of Business.

Career
As of February 2022, Mulili's business career spanned over twenty years. She has experience in sales, marketing, business administration and management, human resources management,  executive coaching, business research, leadership and consulting, among others. For a period of three years, she worked for Msingi East Africa, a non-profit organisation active in Kenya, Rwanda, Tanzania and Uganda, focusing on creating resilient employment opportunities, particularly for the youth. She served as Msingi's acting chief executive officer for one year, from 2019 until 2020. While working as Business Development and Innovation Director at Msingi, she was instrumental in guiding the development of the Cotton, Textiles & Apparel National Strategy and Action Plan for 2020-2025, in Uganda.

Family
She is the mother of two daughters; the eldest was born circa 2003 and the youngest circa 2014.

Other considerations
Since September 2020, she is a member of the Leaders Council at The Amahoro Coalition, an initiative that brings together business leaders in Africa to find solutions to problems that face refugees, focusing on education and living conditions.

See also
 Jennifer Karina
 Wanja Michuki
 Adema Sangale
 Risper Alaro

References

External links
 Personal Profile at LinkedIn.com
 Business Agility: Coaching as a Leadership Transformation Tool As of 10 February 2021.
 The Amahoro Coalition: What We Do

Living people
1979 births
21st-century Kenyan economists
Kamba people
University of Nairobi alumni
African Leadership University alumni
Stanford University alumni